Chalk is a type of sedimentary rock, composed predominantly of calcium carbonate.

Chalk may also refer to:

The Chalk Group, a stratigraphic unit in northwest Europe. 
The Chalk country, a region of Discworld
Blackboard chalk and sidewalk chalk, a material used for writing and art, usually composed of calcium sulfate or calcium carbonate.
Chalk (drying agent), magnesium carbonate, used for hands in rock climbing, gymnastics, and weight lifting
Chalk, Kent, a village in England
Chalk (TV series), a BBC sitcom written by Steven Moffat
Chalk (film), a 2006 film by Mike Akel
Chalk (military), a group of paratroopers or other soldiers that deploy from a single aircraft
Billiard chalk, a silica and corundum compound applied to the tip of a cue
French chalk, or talc, magnesium silicate, usually as a powder or in sticks

Surname
 Alex Chalk, English Conservative Party politician, Member of Parliament (MP) for Cheltenham since May 2015
 Alfred Chalk (1874–1954), British footballer
 Dave Chalk (baseball) (b. 1950), former American Major League baseball player
 Dave Chalk (broadcaster), Canadian journalist and broadcaster
 Garry Chalk (b. 1952), British-born Canadian actor
 Gary Chalk (b. 1952), English illustrator and model-maker
 Gerry Chalk (1910–1943), English cricketer
 Gordon Chalk (1913–1991), Australian politician
 Marshall Chalk (b. 1981), Australian rugby league player
 O. Roy Chalk (1907–1995), American entrepreneur
 Robin Chalk (b. 1981), English actor
 Roger Chalk, Australian politician

See also

Chal (name)
 Chalke (disambiguation)
 Chalk's International Airlines